is a railway station on the Rinkai Line in Shinonome, Tokyo, Japan, operated by Tokyo Waterfront Area Rapid Transit (TWR).

Lines

Services

Station layout
The station has two elevated side platforms serving two tracks.

History
The station opened on 30 March 1996.

Station numbering was introduced to the Rinkai Line platforms in 2016 with Shinonome being assigned station number R02.

Surrounding area
 Tatsumi Station (Tokyo Metro Yurakucho Line)
 Ariake Junior College of Education and the Arts
 Tokyo Ariake University of Medical and Health Sciences
 National Route 357

References

External links

 Shinonome Station information (TWR) 

Railway stations in Japan opened in 1996
TWR Rinkai Line
Stations of Tokyo Waterfront Area Rapid Transit
Railway stations in Tokyo